The  was a field army of the Imperial Japanese Army responsible for the defense of the Kantō region and northern Honshū during the Pacific War. It was one of the regional commands in the Japanese home islands reporting to the General Defense Command.

History
It was essentially a home guard and garrison, responsible for recruitment and civil defense training to ensure the security of Tokyo, Yokohama, and the surrounding areas.

On 1 August 1935, the Tokyo Defense Headquarters was renamed the Eastern Defense Command. On 1 August 1940, it was renamed again as the Eastern Army, which became the Eastern District Army on 1 February 1945.

The Eastern District Army existed concurrently with the Japanese 12th Area Army, which was tasked with organizing the final defenses of Tokyo against the expected American invasion of the Japanese home islands.

The Eastern District Army played an especially significant role in combating the 15 August 1945 attempted coup d'etat of Major Kenji Hatanaka, who sought to prevent the Emperor's announcement of Japan's surrender from being broadcast. At the time, the commander of the Eastern District Army was Lieutenant General Shizuichi Tanaka.

Support of the Eastern District Army was essential to Hatanaka's plan to take over the Imperial Palace, and so Hatanaka exhorted General Tanaka to aid him. Tanaka refused, and later told his men to ignore Strategic Order 584, forged by Hatanaka and ordering the Eastern District Army to seize and defend the Imperial Palace; in short, to aid in the coup. Rather than send in his men to defeat the rebels by force, Tanaka traveled to the Imperial Palace and spoke to Hatanaka and the other rebel leaders personally, haranguing them, and putting an end to the rebellion.

The Eastern District Army remained active for several months after the surrender of Japan to help maintain public order until the arrival of the American occupation forces, and to oversee the final demobilization and dissolution of the Imperial Japanese Army.

Commanders

Commanding officer

Chief of Staff

See also
Kyūjō Incident
Armies of the Imperial Japanese Army

Further reading

External links

Field armies of Japan
Military units and formations established in 1923
Military units and formations disestablished in 1945
1923 establishments in Japan